Valverde is a quarter in the city of Bergamo, located on the north side of the hill of the città alta.  It has a population of approximately 1,000.

It contains a Roman Catholic parish with a church dedicated to the Assumption of the Virgin Mary.  The parish church was damaged by a blaze in November 2006.

The Castello di Valverde in its present form is a 16th-century structure on the site of a medieval castle.

References

Sources
 "Valverde, nome azzeccatissimo". Bergamo News, 17 September 2019 

Quarters of Bergamo